Ginger Blue is an incorporated village in McDonald County, Missouri, United States. The population was 61 at the 2010 census.

Geography
Ginger Blue is located on Route 59, approximately two miles south of Lanagan. It is on the northwest side of a sharp meander in the Elk River. It is part of the Fayetteville–Springdale–Rogers, AR-MO Metropolitan Statistical Area

Demographics

2010 census
As of the census of 2010, there were 61 people, 28 households, and 17 families residing in the village. The racial makeup of the village was 88.5% White, 1.6% African American, 1.6% Pacific Islander, 6.6% from other races, and 1.6% from two or more races. Hispanic or Latino of any race were 6.6% of the population.

There were 28 households, of which 28.6% had children under the age of 18 living with them, 39.3% were married couples living together, 17.9% had a female householder with no husband present, 3.6% had a male householder with no wife present, and 39.3% were non-families. 35.7% of all households were made up of individuals, and 7.2% had someone living alone who was 65 years of age or older. The average household size was 2.18 and the average family size was 2.71.

The median age in the village was 40.6 years. 16.4% of residents were under the age of 18; 13.1% were between the ages of 18 and 24; 29.4% were from 25 to 44; 36% were from 45 to 64; and 4.9% were 65 years of age or older. The gender makeup of the village was 49.2% male and 50.8% female.

References

External links
Ginger Blue, Missouri - McDonald County Press Newspapers.

Villages in McDonald County, Missouri
Northwest Arkansas
Villages in Missouri